Ingulssjøhøi is a mountain on the border of Nord-Fron Municipality and Vågå Municipality in Innlandet county, Norway. The mountain is surrounded by several other notable mountains including Dyrtjørnhøi to the northeast; Sikkilsdalshøa, Gravdalsknappen, Styggehøe, and Heimdalshøe to the southwest; and Besshø to the west.

See also
List of mountains of Norway by height

References

Jotunheimen
Vågå
Nord-Fron
Mountains of Innlandet